Manuel Personè (born May 17, 1992 in Milan) is an Italian forward who plays for Tritium Calcio 1908.

Career
In June 2019, Personé joined Tritium Calcio 1908.

Apps on Italian Series 

Coppa Italia : 2 app

Total : 2 app

References

External links

Living people
1992 births
Italian footballers
U.C. AlbinoLeffe players
A.C. Cuneo 1905 players
A.C. Giacomense players
S.S.D. Pro Sesto players
S.P.A.L. players
S.F. Aversa Normanna players
Forlì F.C. players
Abano Calcio players
A.S.D. HSL Derthona players
Tritium Calcio 1908 players
Serie C players
Serie D players
Association football forwards